Coptocheile is a monotypic genus of flowering plants possibly belonging to the family Gesneriaceae. Its only species is Coptocheile macrorhiza. It is native to Brazil.

Description
A very brief description published in 1842 describes the plant as resembling the genus Gesneria, with the flower having an elongated upper lip and an obliquely truncated lower lip comprising three small divisions, the middle smallest, the lateral ones slightly more prominent. The anthers are joined to an eight-lobed disc.

Taxonomy
The only species Coptocheile macrorhiza was described in 1842 by Karl Nägel, who attributed the name to Johann Centurius Hoffmannsegg in a 31 page appendix to Verzeichniss der Pflanzenkulturen in den Grafl. Hoffmannseggischen Garten zu Dresden und Rammenau for 1841, also published in 1842. It was placed in the family Gesneriaceae. In the APG IV system, the genus is treated as incertae sedis, with the remark that it may belong in Gesneriaceae but "may belong elsewhere in Lamiales". Neither the genus name nor the species appear in a 2020 key to the genera of the family Gesneriaceae, nor in a 2020 index to the names of New World members of the family Gesneriaceae, so their modern status and classification is unclear .

References

Gesneriaceae
Gesneriaceae genera